Miravalle may refer to:

The estate of the Spring Mountain Vineyard, California, USA
Chapultepec Castle, known as Miravalle Castle during the Second Mexican Empire
, Mexican noble title
Hacienda San José de Miravalle, Mexico
Mark Miravalle, a theologian

See also
Miravalles (disambiguation)